Amar Sin Mentiras (Love Without Lies) is the seventh studio album and fifth Spanish language album recorded by American singer-songwriter Marc Anthony. It was released by Sony Music Latin and Columbia Records en 8 June 2004. The album was produced by Colombian singer-songwriter Estéfano. It is his first pop album in spanish. It also features the vocals of Jennifer López. It won Grammy Award for Best Latin Pop Album at 47th Annual Grammy Awards on 13 February 2005. "¿Ahora Quién?" reached No. 1 on Hot Latin Tracks in 2004.

Track listing

Personnel 
 Mauricio Gasca – arranger, programmer and recording engineer 
 Andrew Synowieck – electric guitar 
 Julio C. Reyes – piano 
 Guillermo Vadala – bass guitar 
 Daniel Ávila – drums 
 Juan José "Chaqueno" Martinez, Eduardo Avena – percussion 
 Óscar Chino Asencio – Acoustic and electric guitar 
 Álex Batista, Claudio Ledda, Diana Pereyra, Ana Karfi, Dorita, Chávez, Vicky Echeverri, Jose Luis Pagán – background vocals .

Charts

Certifications

References 

2004 albums
Marc Anthony albums
Sony Discos albums
Columbia Records albums
Albums produced by Estéfano
Grammy Award for Best Latin Pop Album